Pipestone National Monument is located in southwestern Minnesota, just north of the city of Pipestone, Minnesota.  It is located along the highways of U.S. Route 75, Minnesota State Highway 23 and Minnesota State Highway 30. The quarries are sacred to many tribal nations of North America, including the Dakota, Lakota, and other tribes of Native Americans, and were considered neutral territory in the historic past where all Nations could quarry stone for ceremonial pipes. The catlinite, or "pipestone", is traditionally used to make ceremonial pipes, vitally important to traditional Plains Indian religious practices. Archeologists believe the site has been in use for over 3000 years with Minnesota pipestone having been found inside North American burial mounds dated much earlier.

From the 15th to 18th centuries the Iowa people lived by the quarry.  By the 1700s, the Sioux were the dominant tribe in the area. In 1851 the Sisseton and Wahpeton bands of the Dakota signed the Traverse des Sioux treaty ceding southwest Minnesota to the U.S. Government including the quarry. However, some of that ceded land was claimed by the Yankton people and they were not present nor signers of the treaty. To protect the site, the Yankton Sioux secured unrestricted access via article 8 of the Yankton Treaty signed on April 19, 1858. That created a one-mile square reservation, of over 600 acres, which was encroached upon by settlers multiple times. In 1891, the United States took a 100 acre parcel of the Yankton's Pipestone Reservation to build the Pipestone Indian School. The Yankton tribe contested this seizure as illegal taking their claim to the U.S Supreme Court.   The court ruled in their favor in 1926 and ordered that they be compensated. Afterwards, the land came under full control of the U.S. Government. The Pipestone Indian School closed in 1953 with the acreage remaining from the school transferred to the Minnesota Department of Natural Resources to create the Pipestone Wildlife Management Area. A boundary change occurred on June 18, 1956 with the original reservation reduced to just 108 acres. 

In 1863 conditions at the Crow Creek Reservation were so dire that Congress appropriated money to send supplies.  The Superintendent of Indian Affairs for the Northern Superintendency, Clark W. Thompson, turned the aid into a corrupt scheme for himself, his brother and an associate.  Instead of buying the provisions at the closest source and sending them by the quickest riverboat transport they were purchased in Mankato, Minnesota and sent overland.  Substandard and outright spoilt foodstuffs were sent via a wagon train of 150 wagons that transited the quarry en-route to Fort Thompson and given the name "The Moscow Expedition" by a writer at the St. Paul Press for its departure so late in the year.
  
The National Monument was established by an act of Congress on August 25, 1937, with the establishing legislation reaffirming the quarrying rights of the Native Americans.  Any enrolled member of a federally recognized American Indian tribe may apply for a free quarry permit to dig for the pipestone. The National Park Service regularly consults with representatives from 23 affiliated tribal nations to discuss land management practices, historic preservation, exhibit design, and other facets of the park's management. The historic area is listed on the National Register of Historic Places under the heading "Cannomok'e—Pipestone National Monument". Cannomok'e means "pipestone quarry" in the Dakota language. The pipestone quarries within the monument are also designated as a Minnesota State Historic Site.

During the summer months, there are cultural demonstrations at the monument. The Upper Midwest Indian Cultural Center, located inside the visitor center, sponsors demonstrations of pipemaking by Native craftworkers using the stone from the quarries. Local Native Americans carve the stones using techniques passed down from their ancestors. Many of the demonstrators are third or fourth generation pipe makers. Visitors can also walk along a three-quarter mile (1.2 km) self-guided trail to view the pipestone quarries and a waterfall.  A trail guide is available at the visitor center. About  of the national monument has been restored to native tallgrass prairie. Monument staff burn prairie parcels on a rotating basis to control weeds and stimulate growth of native grasses. A larger area of restored tallgrass prairie and a small bison herd are maintained by the Minnesota DNR at Blue Mounds State Park,  to the south. The visitor center features exhibits about the natural and cultural history of the site, including a display of the petroglyphs found around the quarry.  There is also an orientation video about the history of the pipestone quarries.

The Smithsonian Museum has an extensive collection of 705 catlinite objects that it attributes to the Pipestone quarry, 585 of which are pipes. 
Catlinite Pipes East of the Rockies

See also
 List of national monuments of the United States

References

External links

National Monument Holds Ancient Pipestone Quarries (travel article)

1937 establishments in Minnesota
Archaeological sites on the National Register of Historic Places in Minnesota
Dakota
Historic American Engineering Record in Minnesota
Historic districts on the National Register of Historic Places in Minnesota
Lakota
Museums in Pipestone County, Minnesota
National Park Service National Monuments in Minnesota
National Register of Historic Places in Pipestone County, Minnesota
Native American history of Minnesota
Native American museums in Minnesota
Pipe smoking
Protected areas established in 1937
Protected areas of Pipestone County, Minnesota
Quarries in the United States
Religious places of the indigenous peoples of North America